(), alternatively described as , / ("what are you talking about?"), or simply  ("what?"), is one of the best known hand gestures of Italy. In English, it is sometimes referred to as "pinched fingers" or "finger purse".

It is meant to express disbelief at what the other person is saying, and/or to ridicule their opinions.

It is produced where the tips of all the fingers of one hand are brought together to form an "upward pointing cone", with the hand then being moved up and down either from the wrist or forearm. The hand can be motionless while performing this hand gesture, or can also be shaken up and down, if the person wants to express impatience. While it is particularly common in the South, it is a gesture that is widely used in Italy. The frequency and speed of vertical motion indicates the level of frustration of the speaker.

The gesture is also widely used in Uruguay and Argentina, two countries with large Italian diasporas, with similar connotations. In Chichewa the gesture refers to human testicles.

The emoji for the gesture (🤌) was proposed in 2019 as submission L2/19-159, approved as part of Unicode 13.0 in 2020, and added later that year as U+1F90C.

The gesture and the emoji became popular among Sri Lankan Facebook community as the iconic gesture of Anura Kumara Dissanayaka, the leader of a prominent leftist party Janatha Vimukthi Peramuna in the island in a pejorative manner to indicate exaggeration or lying. The gesture is identified by them as the "Gajabinna Mudrawa" (Gesture of Blatant Lies).

The same gesture is used in Israel with a different meaning, it means "wait a minute" or "give me a minute".

References

External links 
 

Hand gestures
Italian culture